Ain Aanoub, is a small, peaceful village in Aley District in the Mount Lebanon Governorate of Lebanon.
Ain Aanoub surrounded by following villages: Choueifat, Aitat, Ainab, Bechamoun. Ain Aanoub is 350m above sea level, it can be accessible via 4 different routes from the surrounding villages. It Although small, It is a thriving village with a great community during a time of hardship in Lebanon. The main street, The Ain, leads onto the other micro sectors of the village such as Khalet. It is a village located on the top of a valley which overlooks parts of Beirut and the Beirut Rafic Hariri International Airport. This convenient location of the village allows its citizens to go to Beirut and other villages quite easily and frequently when they have fuel for their cars and when the roads are not blocked. This gives them the possible weekend day life in Ain Aanoub of farming and then the night life in the nightclubs of Beirut. On the main street next to the shops, there lays a large structure made from rocks that has the purist water coming from the reservoir of water and snowy mountains that runs year long. It is also good luck for any passerby's to drink from said structure.

References

External links
 Ain Aanoub, Localiban

Populated places in Aley District